The  is an electric multiple unit (EMU) train type for local services on the Chichibu Main Line operated by the private railway operator Chichibu Railway in Japan since March 2009.

Details
Two 3-car trains were converted from former Tokyu 8500 series cars, and entered service from 26 March 2009. The end cars of the second set, 7002, were modified from former intermediate cars with the addition of new driving cabs.

Formation

The DeHa 7000 and 7200 cars are each fitted with one lozenge-type pantograph.

References

External links

 Chichibu Railway information about 7000 series trains 
 Chichibu Railway 7000 series (Japan Railfan Magazine Online) 

Electric multiple units of Japan
Train-related introductions in 2009
Chichibu Railway
Tokyu Car multiple units
1500 V DC multiple units of Japan